The Bierkeller Theatre was a theatre in Broadmead, Bristol, England, located inside Bristol's oldest night club, the Bristol Bierkeller.

Previously a host for the Bristol Shakespeare Festival, the Bierkeller Theatre officially opened in mid-January 2012, receiving local, national and international companies.

The theatre announced its inaugural season, with a production "Rescue Me!", from the local company of actors FarOutMan Theatre. Since the opening of the theatre over 150 productions have been staged. An intern scheme for technical staff has been developed with the University of the West of England and Filton College. The theatre also works with students from Bath Spa University.

The theatre reduced its output after the departure of artistic director, Alex MacMillan, in June 2014 and closed at the same time the Bristol Bierkeller shut down in January 2018.

References

Culture in Bristol
Theatres in Bristol
Music venues in Bristol